Kakhk (also Romanized as Kākhk and Kākhak; also known as Kāhak) is a village in Jolgeh-e Mazhan Rural District, Jolgeh-e Mazhan District, Khusf County, South Khorasan Province, Iran. At the 2006 census, its population was 85, in 27 families.

References 

Populated places in Khusf County